Softly, Softly (also known as Sotto... sotto) is a 1984 Italian comedy-drama film directed and co-written by Lina Wertmüller. The film was released in Italy on 1 March 1984.

Plot 

Ester finds herself sexually attracted to her newly divorced friend Adele. When Ester admits another love to her hot-headed husband, he searches manically for the rival, who he never suspects is a woman.

Cast 
 Enrico Montesano as Oscar
 Veronica Lario as Ester 
 Luisa De Santis as Adele
 Massimo Wertmüller as Ginetto
 Mario Scarpetta as Amilcare
 Isa Danieli as Rosa
 Lella Fabrizi as Sora Ines
 Alfredo Bianchini as Il sacerdote
 Renato D'Amore as Mario
 Antonia Dell'Atte as Bellissima
 Giuseppe Cederna as Cinecittà actor

Reception

Critical response

References

Further reading

External links
 
 
  Sotto... sotto... strapazzato da anomala passione at Archivio del Cinema Italiano (Italian Cinema Database)
  Sotto...sotto, VHS cover, Columbia Pictures, via notreCinéma

1984 films
1984 comedy-drama films
1984 LGBT-related films
Italian comedy-drama films
1980s Italian-language films
Italian LGBT-related films
Bisexuality-related films
Lesbian-related films
Films about infidelity
Films set in Rome
Films directed by Lina Wertmüller
1984 comedy films
1984 drama films
1980s Italian films